Tyrone William Power IV (born January 22, 1959), usually billed as Tyrone Power Jr., is an American actor, the only son of Hollywood star Tyrone Power and his third wife Deborah Minardos Power. He was born after the death of his father.

He is the fourth actor to bear the name Tyrone Power, the first being his great-great-grandfather the Irish actor Tyrone Power (1795–1841). He is known as Tyrone Power Jr. because his father is the most famous of the four (his grandfather has retroactively become known as Tyrone Power Sr.). Tyrone Jr. also made a guest appearance on the NBC sitcom Cheers.

Power married Canadian comedian Carla Collins in 2007.

Filmography

References

External links

1959 births
Living people
American male film actors
Lee Strasberg Theatre and Film Institute alumni
Power family